Beat (pronounced "Bey-ah-t") is a German male given name, derived from the Latin name Beatus, which means "blessed". The name is common in German-speaking Switzerland because of St Beatus of Lungern, considered a patron saint. The female variant is Beate. The name Beat may refer to:

Beat Bosch (born 1971), Swiss athlete
Beat Breu (born 1957), Swiss cyclist
Beat Fehr (1943–1967), Swiss racing driver
Beat Feuz (born 1987), Swiss alpine skier
Beat Forster (born 1983), Swiss ice hockey player
Beat Furrer (born 1954), Austrian composer 
Beat Gähwiler (born 1965), Swiss athlete
Beat Gerber (born 1982), Swiss ice hockey player
Beat Hefti (born 1978), Swiss bobsledder
Beat W. Hess (born 1949), Swiss businessman
Beat Koch (born 1972), Swiss cross country skier 
Beat Mändli (born 1969), Swiss equestrian 
Beat Müller (born 1978), Swiss sport shooter
Beat Raaflaub (born 1946), Swiss conductor
Beat Richner (born 1947), Swiss doctor
Beat Rüedi (1920–2009), Swiss ice hockey player 
Beat Schwerzmann (born 1966), Swiss rower
Beat Seitz (born 1973), Swiss bobsledder 
Beat Streuli (born 1957), Swiss artist
Beat Sutter (born 1962), Swiss football player
Beat Wyss (born 1947), Swiss art historian
Beat Zberg (born 1971), Swiss cyclist
Beat/Doctor Beat, a fictional character in the Gloria Estefan song Dr. Beat

See also
Beate
Beatus

References

German masculine given names